Dmitri Sergeyevich Stolyarov (born 6 September 1992) is a Russian professional football player.

Club career
He made his Russian Football National League debut for FC Nizhny Novgorod on 3 November 2010 in a game against FC Volga Nizhny Novgorod.

External links
 
 
 Career summary by sportbox.ru

1992 births
Living people
Russian footballers
Association football defenders
FC Nizhny Novgorod (2007) players
FC Sever Murmansk players